The Roman Catholic Diocese of Ji-Paraná is a diocese located in the city of Ji-Paraná in the Ecclesiastical province of Porto Velho in Brazil.

History
 3 January 1978: Established as Territorial Prelature of Vila Rondônia from the Territorial Prelature of Guajará-Mirim and Territorial Prelature of Porto Velho
 19 February 1983: Promoted as Diocese of Ji-Paraná
 23 December 1997: Lost territory, along with Diocese of Diamantino, to establish Diocese of Juína

Leadership, in the chronological order
 Prelate of Vila Rondônia (Roman Rite)
 Bishop José Martins da Silva, S.D.N. (1978.01.03 – 1982.10.04), appointed Archbishop of Porto Velho, Rondonia
 Bishops of Ji-Paraná (Roman rite)
 Bishop Antônio Possamai, S.D.B. (1983.03.04 – 2007.04.11)
 Bishop Bruno Pedron, S.D.B. (2007.04.11 – 2019.06.05)
 Bishop Norbert Hans Christoph Foerster, S.V.D. (2020.12.02 – present)

References
 GCatholic.org
 Catholic Hierarchy
 Diocese website (Portuguese)

Roman Catholic dioceses in Brazil
Christian organizations established in 1978
Ji-Paraná, Roman Catholic Diocese of
Roman Catholic dioceses and prelatures established in the 20th century
diocese